Birsa Dasgupta (born 2 November 1979) is an Indian Bengali film director based in Tollywood.He is well known for directing films such as   Shudhu Tomari Jonyo, Gangster,
Psycho (2021 film)

Early life 
Born in Kolkata, his grandfather was noted documentary filmmaker Harisadhan Dasgupta, and grandmother was screenwriter Sonali (Senroy) Dasgupta, who later married Italian film director, Roberto Rossellini.  His father is film director Raja Dasgupta, while his mother is television presenter and actress Chaitali Dasgupta. Ribhu Dasgupta is his only brother. He did his class 10 from South End School and class 12 from Delhi.

Personal life 
Birsa married Bengali actress, Bidipta Chakraborty. Meghla Dasgupta and Ida Dasgupta are his daughters.

Career
Intending to learn film making, Dasgupta left his graduation midway and moved to Mumbai. Here he started assisting in serials and films. Thereafter, he started making fillers and promos for the newly established audiovisual division of publishing house, MiD DAY. In 2003, he became a unit director in Anurag Kashyap's film Black Friday (2004), though the film's release was stalled for further three years as it ran into troubles with Indian Censor Board. Nevertheless, the music video Dasgupta directed for the song Arey Ruk Ja Re Bandeh of the film soundtrack album, performed by band Indian Ocean, got him noticed.

Dasgupta returned to Kolkata in 2005, realising he would prefer making films in his native Bengali, thus made he went on make Bengali telefilms, Ekti Romharshak Dakatir Golpo  and K, both made in 2006 for Bengali music channel, Tara Muzik. The film instantly got him acclaim, though a telefilm, Ekti Romharshak Dakatir Golpo , even took part in the Thrissur International Film Festival.

Eventually, Dasgupta made his feature film debut with, 033 in 2010. 033 is the STD code for Kolkata city, and the film was incidentally based on the theme of increasing youth migration outside Kolkata for career opportunities.

Filmography

Films

Web series

Television series
Mahanayak (TV series) was a Bengali television drama series  on June 27, 2016, on Star Jalsha . The series starred Prosenjit Chatterjee, Paoli Dam, Tanushree Chakraborty, Priyanka Sarkar, Manali Dey, Biswanath Basu and Biswajit Chakraborty in lead roles.

References

External links

Website
Birsa Dasgupta Profile

1975 births
Living people
Film directors from Kolkata
Bengali film directors